The open event group competition at the 2017 World Games in Wrocław was played on 22 July. 30 Aerobic gymnastics competitors, from 6 nations, participated in the tournament. The Aerobic gymnastics competition took place at Centennial Hall in Lower Silesian Voivodeship.

Competition format
The top 4 teams in qualifications, advanced to the final. The scores in qualification do not count in the final.

Qualification

Final

Final standing

Medalists

References
Qualification round results
Final round results

External links
 Result on IWGA website

Open event group